Crawford Logan is a British actor best known for his work in radio. In 2006 he became the latest actor to play the eponymous hero Paul Temple in a revival of the long-running mystery series on BBC radio. In 2009 he narrated the BBC Radio 4 Book of the Week, Newton and the Counterfeiter by Thomas Levenson.

On television, he has appeared in Doctor Who as Deedrix in The Tom Baker story Meglos and Secret Army. He is also a member of the band The Martians.  Crawford Logan played D.I. Donaghue in the crime drama "P Division: Code Four One" on BBC Radio 4 in the 1994 and 1995 series.

Radio

References

External links

Crawford Logan radio appearances

British male radio actors
British male television actors
Living people
Year of birth missing (living people)